The 1565 siege of Kuragano was one of many battles fought during Takeda Shingen's quest for power during Japan's Sengoku period. Kuragano castle, in Kōzuke Province, and held by Kuragano Naoyuki, withstood siege by Shingen in 1561, but fell four years later.

References
Turnbull, Stephen (1998). 'The Samurai Sourcebook'. London: Cassell & Co.

1565 in Japan
Sieges involving Japan
Battles of the Sengoku period
Conflicts in 1564